Solute carrier family 2, facilitated glucose transporter member 7 also known as glucose transporter 7 (GLUT7) is a protein that in humans is encoded by the SLC2A7  gene.

SLC2A7 belongs to a family of transporters that catalyze the uptake of sugars through facilitated diffusion. This family of transporters shows conservation of 12 transmembrane helices as well as functionally significant amino acid residues.

See also 
 Glucose transporter

References

Further reading

Solute carrier family